Thomas Case Brittain is an American attorney and politician. He is a member of the South Carolina House of Representatives from the 107th District, serving since 2020. He is a member of the Republican party.

References

Living people
Republican Party members of the South Carolina House of Representatives
21st-century American politicians
People from Columbia, South Carolina
1978 births
Wofford College alumni